The District of Radnorshire was one of three local government districts of the county of Powys, Wales, from 1974 until 1996. The district had an identical area to the previous administrative county of Radnorshire. The district was abolished in 1996, with Powys County Council taking over its functions.

History
The district was created as Radnor on 1 April 1974 under the Local Government Act 1972. It covered the administrative county of Radnorshire, which was abolished at the same time. The new district replaced the previous eight district level authorities in Radnorshire:
Colwyn Rural District
Knighton Rural District
Knighton Urban District
Llandrindod Wells Urban District
New Radnor Rural District
Painscastle Rural District
Presteigne Urban District
Rhayader Rural District

On 8 May 1989 the district was renamed Radnorshire by resolution of the district council.

The district was abolished by the Local Government (Wales) Act 1994, with its functions transferring to Powys County Council on 1 April 1996.

Political control
The first election to the council was held in 1973, initially operating as a shadow authority before coming into its powers on 1 April 1974. A majority of the seats on the council were held by independents throughout the council's existence.

Premises

The council was based at The Gwalia, on Ithon Road in Llandrindod Wells, which had been built in 1900 as the Gwalia Hotel and had served as the offices of the old Radnorshire County Council since 1950. After the council's abolition The Gwalia became an area office for Powys County Council.

References

History of Powys
Radnorshire
Districts of Wales abolished in 1996
1974 establishments in Wales